Näslund is a Swedish surname. Notable people with the surname include:

 Bertil Näslund (1933–2016), Swedish economist
 Israel Israelsson Näslund (1796-1858),  Swedish vicar of Ytterlännäs parish
 Markus Näslund (born 1973), Swedish ice hockey player
 Mats Näslund (born 1959), Swedish ice hockey player
 Patrik Näslund (born 1992), Swedish professional ice hockey player
 Sandra Näslund (born 1996), Swedish freestyle skier
 Sena Jeter Naslund (born 1942), American writer
 Totta Näslund (1945–2005), Swedish musician
 Viktor Näslund (born 1992), Swedish professional ice hockey player

Swedish-language surnames